Al-Gazali-Donnai-Mueller syndrome, also known as Hirschsprung's disease, hypoplastic nails, and minor dysmorphic features syndrome  is a rare and deadly genetic disorder which is characterized by Hirschsprung's disease, nail and distal limb hypoplasia, flat facies, upslanting palpebral fissures, narrow philtrum, high palate, micrognathia and low-set ears. No more new cases have been reported in medical literature since 1988. It is a type of Hirschsprung's syndrome.

References 

Genetic diseases and disorders